Platyischnopidae is a family of amphipod crustaceans. Its members are characterised by the conical rostrum, which is covered with sensory pits at the end. Although digging behaviour has only been directly observed in a few taxa, it is assumed that all the animals in the family Platyischnopidae are fossorial. The genera included in Platyischnopidae are Skaptopus, Platyischnopus, Indischnopus, Tiburonella, Eudevenopus, Tittakunara, Tomituka and Yurrokus.

References

Gammaridea
Crustacean families